Cloud marketing is the process of an organization's efforts to market their goods and services online through integrated digital experiences, by which they are specialised for every end-user. The aim is to use advertising methods to target customers via online applications through social media websites such as Facebook, Twitter and various online portals to target consumers. Cloud marketing platforms could be supported by third party providers that maintain the platform.

Cloud marketing was established by a company in Raleigh, North Carolina, calling it SharedVue Marketing Technologies. The company is targeting clients' need to ensure that their marketing content is compatible across multiple digital media.
Cloud marketing requires efforts in data privacy and data protection, especially for EU markets where GDPR (General Data Protection Regulation) has changed the regulatory landscape.

Claimed advantages for business

Cost-effectiveness
Cloud marketing enables businesses to reduce the cost of print distribution materials such as newspapers, circulars, direct mail, catalogues, and magazines and instead send strategic promotional content to consumers through digital formats. This allows businesses to send content digitally, which is a faster and cheaper approach to engage with customers. This reduces the printing costs and increases efficiency.

Customisation
Customisation allows business to creatively use interactive means to develop a relevant and effective advertising approach when targeting a consumer. Customisation includes social media sites such as Facebook to customize pages and send to friends or the public over the internet. Marketers can combine data through third party data sources, including email and surveys, to visualize the consumer's experience.

Time
Time is vital for targeting customers. Advertising using traditional methods, such as posters and surveys, have limited time before they often become invalid. Cloud marketing enables business to produce advertising when required. The material can easily be removed and if the campaign or season is over, the material can be erased from the internet or adapted to enhance material to the end user, linking with the customisation element to ensure the marketing material is fit for its purpose, and delivered at the correct time.

Disadvantages for businesses

User experience
When company markets their products and services to consumer, the consumer is not able to physically touch or manage the product or service. This experience could potentially lay off customers that have been targeted, if the businesses efforts have not satisfied the consumer's decision to buy the merchandise. The material content would vary on the device, as compatibility and operating systems will affect the material content being delivered.

Fraudulent material
Internet fraud has grown rapidly globally, faster than the internet. More and more fraudulent criminals can send promotional pop-ups in the form of online advertising on the World Wide Web to attract web traffic and display promotional content. The malware attacks can lay off customers responding to marketing material posted to their devices. Labour MP Chris Evans said: “Copycat websites are a part of a growing industry which exists purely to trick the public out of their hard-earned money.”

Digital divide
Digital divide is the partition between a given population within their use of information technology. This can be due to factors including:
Geographic
Cultural 
Economic growth
Democracy
Disabilities
This limits businesses' performance to market their goods and services globally to new locations if there is limited access to information technology in certain locations. The segment of consumers would be unable to experience and view online marketing methods from a  business  or resources, resulting in adopted a  traditional method of leaflets and bill boards known as direct marketing.

Cloud marketing plan strategy
Strategy is the direction of action which will achieve a goal or objective. The strategy for cloud marketing is divided into four (4) key elements.

Establishing the goals
The first step into cloud marketing is finding the objective or goal for the marketing project. The proposer would need to clearly state the objectives, which can be retained in quantitative or qualitative data. By establishing the goal and objectives of the marketing campaign, this limits the plan being deployed haphazardly.

Development
The development stage is where the marketing team creates the graphics and media material. The web development team find a method to post the material onto the World Wide Web or online source. The marketing ad would need to meet its main objective and purpose, the development team will need to develop and plan to make the material visually appealing.

Maintenance
The maintenance step will require updating whilst the material is online which require continuous upkeep. Cloud marketing techniques include regular updating to ensure they are reaching their end-user and have a valid subject. Marketing members are responsible for moderating any discussion boards and keeping content updated  increasing the validity.

Evaluation
Throughout the duration of the marketing material, the message would need to be evaluated to determine how successful it has been to the end-user. The outcome should be established in the strategy, allowing the marketer to adapt and increase the overall efficiency of the cloud marketing method.

See also
Adobe Marketing Cloud
Cloud computing
Direct marketing

References

Direct marketing
Advertising by medium